Other (also stylized as [O T H E R] and other variations) is a 2008 studio album by Brian "Lustmord" Williams, released on Hydra Head Records. [ O T H E R ] was also released as a two disc set on Japanese label Daymare Recordings with the second disc featuring the Lustmord release "Juggernaut" in its entirety.

Track listing

(All tracks credited to B. Lustmord. Except track 7 credited to B. Lustmord/King Buzzo)

Personnel
B. Lustmord – sound design
Adam Jones – guitar on "Godeater", "Dark Awakening" and "Er Ub Us", cover artwork
Aaron Turner – guitar on "Element"
King Buzzo – guitar on "Prime [Aversion]"
Paul Haslinger – additional source sounds on "Godeater"

References

2008 albums
Lustmord albums
Hydra Head Records albums